U.S. Route 1 (US 1) in the U.S. state of Maine is a major north–south U.S. Route serving the eastern part of the state. It parallels the Atlantic Ocean from New Hampshire north through Portland, Brunswick, and Belfast to Calais, and then the St. Croix River and the rest of the Canada–U.S. border via Houlton to Fort Kent. The portion along the ocean, known as the Coastal Route, provides a scenic alternate to Interstate 95 (I-95).

Route description

US 1 enters Maine from New Hampshire by bridging the Piscataqua River at Kittery on the Memorial Bridge. Following the sandy southern Maine coast, the highway bridges the Cape Neddick River in Cape Neddick; the Josias and Ogunquit rivers in Ogunquit; the Webhannet River in Wells; and the Merriland, Mousam, and Kennebunk rivers in Kennebunk. After bridging the Saco River between Biddeford and Saco, the highway bridges the Nonesuch River in Scarborough.

In South Portland, US 1 merges with I-295 at exit 4 and continues north through downtown Portland to Tukey's Bridge, now on I-295, before separating at exit 9. The Charles Loring Highway is part of US 1 in Portland. Like Loring Air Force Base, it is named for Charles J. Loring Jr.

North of Portland, the highway bridges the Presumpscot River in Falmouth, the Royal River in Yarmouth, and the Cousins River in Freeport before following the Androscoggin River through Brunswick and crossing the Kennebec River on the Sagadahoc Bridge between Bath and Woolwich. The section between Brunswick (at its junction with US 201) and Bath is a four-lane freeway, and the route continues as a four-lane expressway through most of Bath, then crosses on a two-lane viaduct before becoming four lanes again on the bridge over the Kennebec River. It then becomes a three-lane road (with center turning lane) through Woolwich and then reverts to two lanes after that as it continues north toward Wiscasset. 
 
The highway bridges the Sheepscot River in Wiscasset, the Damariscotta River in Damariscotta, the Medomak River in Waldoboro, and the Saint George River in Thomaston before reaching Rockland.

In Rockland, there is a bypass of downtown (US 1A) which travels along Broadway and Maverick streets, while US 1 itself has a one way pair with Main and Union streets in the downtown Rockland area (Main Street traffic goes north with two lanes, while Union Street traffic is southbound).

The highway follows the coast of Penobscot Bay bridging the Goose River in Rockport, the Ducktrap River in Lincolnville, the Little River in Northport, and the Passagassawakeag River in Belfast before bridging the Penobscot River at Bucksport. The Atlantic coast is less frequently visible as the highway bridges the Orland River in Orland, the Union River in Ellsworth, Sullivan Harbor in Sullivan, the Narraguagus River in Cherryfield, the Harrington River in Harrington, the Pleasant River at Columbia Falls, the Indian River in Addison, and the Chandler River in Jonesboro.

After bridging the East Machias and Machias rivers in Machias, the highway turns inland along Passamaquoddy Bay to bridge the Orange River in Whiting, the Dennys River in Dennysville, and the Pennamaquan River in Pembroke. The highway then follows the St. Croix River through Calais and turns inland at Woodland. The interior route bridges Grand Falls Flowage at Princeton, the Meduxnekeag River in Houlton, the North Branch Meduxnekeag River in Monticello, and the Aroostook River in Presque Isle before following the Saint John River upstream from Van Buren to Fort Kent.

From Madawaska to its "northern" terminus at the Clair–Fort Kent Bridge in Fort Kent, US 1 north actually travels geographically south. The route's most northerly geographic point is at its intersection with the Edmundston–Madawaska Bridge in Madawaska, across the Saint John River from Edmundston, New Brunswick, Canada.

History

US 1 south of Calais was initially part of the Atlantic Highway and became Route 1 when the New England road marking system was established in 1922. The northward continuation from Calais was later designated as part of Route 24. In the original plan, Route 24 was to run from Brunswick to Moosehead Lake in Greenville. By 1925, however, Maine had transferred the Route 24 designation to a completely new alignment on the eastern edge of the state, running from Calais to Madawaska at a border crossing with Edmundston, New Brunswick.

The initial 1925 plan for the U.S. Route system took US 1 along the better-quality inland route (then Route 15) between Bangor and Houlton, and placed US 2 on the coastal route. This changed in the final 1926 plan, when the inland shortcut—now generally followed by I-95—became part of US 2.

The Waldo–Hancock Bridge opened in 1931, allowing US 1 to bypass Bangor; the old route became US 1A.

The portion between Portland and Brunswick was rebuilt, mainly as a four-lane divided highway, in the 1950s, and later absorbed into I-95 (now I-295). A freeway from Brunswick east to Bath was built in the 1960s.

Major junctions

References

External links

Maine State Route Log via floodgap.com

01
 1 Maine
Transportation in York County, Maine
Transportation in Cumberland County, Maine
Transportation in Sagadahoc County, Maine
Transportation in Lincoln County, Maine
Transportation in Knox County, Maine
Transportation in Waldo County, Maine
Transportation in Hancock County, Maine
Transportation in Washington County, Maine
Transportation in Aroostook County, Maine